Hyalosperma is a genus of Australian flowering plants in the family Asteraceae.

 Species
The species occur in all 6 states of Australia but not in the Northern Territory.

References

Gnaphalieae
Endemic flora of Australia
Asteraceae genera